Kohima Chiethu Airport is a greenfield airport currently under construction at Chiethu, 25 kilometres north of Kohima, the capital of Nagaland in India. It will operate as a second airport for Nagaland with the existing Dimapur Airport continuing to operate. The new airport is being built by the Airports Authority of India (AAI) over an area of 645 acres.

Status updates
 In 2006, the central government carried out a field assessment for the project. The report was later “nullified” as the feasibility report was found to be “unclear”.
 In 2020, the Airports Authority of India agreed to prepare a detailed project report (DPR) of the Kohima Chiethu Airport.
 On 15 July 2021, the Ministry of Defence issued a "no-objection certificate" (NOC) for the proposed airport at Chiethu, Kohima.

See also
 List of airports in India

References

External links 

Airports in Nagaland
Proposed airports in Nagaland
Transport in Nagaland
Buildings and structures in Nagaland